Uraria is a genus of plants in the family, Fabaceae. It belongs to the subfamily Faboideae and the tribe Desmodieae.

Species 
Plants of the World lists:
 Uraria acaulis Schindl.
 Uraria acuminata Kurz
 Uraria balansae Schindl.
 Uraria barbaticaulis Iokawa, T.Nemoto, J.Murata & H.Ohashi
 Uraria campanulata  (Benth.) Gagnep.
 Uraria candida Backer
 Uraria cochinchinensis Schindl.
 Uraria cordifolia Wall.
 Uraria crinita  (L.) Desv. ex DC.
 Uraria gossweileri Baker f.
 Uraria gracilis Prain
 Uraria kurzii Schindl.
 Uraria lacei Craib
 Uraria lagopodioides  (L.) DC.
 Uraria lagopus DC.
 Uraria picta  (Jacq.) Desv. ex DC.
 Uraria pierrei Schindl.
 Uraria poilanei Dy Phon
 Uraria prunellifolia Graham ex Baker
 Uraria rotundata Craib
 Uraria rufescens  (DC.) Schindl.
 Uraria sinensis Franch.

Gallery

References

External links

Fabaceae genera
Desmodieae